Robyn is a gender-neutral given name. Robin is a variant which is both masculine and feminine. It is of Germanic origin and means 'bright famous one'.
Notable people with the name include:

 Robyn (born 1979, Robin Miriam Carlsson), Swedish pop singer and songwriter
 Robyn Archer (born 1948), Australian singer, songwriter and stage director
 Robyn Arianrhod, Australian historian of science
 Robyn Curnow (born 1972), South African anchor
 Robyn Denholm (born 1962/1963), Australian businesswoman, chair of Tesla, Inc.
 Robyn Donald (born 1940), New Zealand writer of romance novels
 Robyn Ebbern (born 1944), Australian tennis player
 Robyn Rihanna Fenty, often known as Rihanna (born 1988), Barbadian pop singer, fashion designer and billionaire businesswoman CEO and founder of Fenty Beauty
 Robyn Gayle (born 1985), Canadian football player
 Robyn Griggs (1973-2022), American actress
 Robyn Hitchcock (born 1953), British singer-songwriter and artist
 Robyn Lambird (born 1997), Australian wheelchair racer
 Robyn Lawley (born 1989), Australian model
 Robyn Layton, Australian lawyer
 Robyn Lively (born 1972), American actress
 Robyn Loau (born 1972), Australian singer, songwriter and actress
 Robyn Malcolm (born 1965), New Zealand actress
 Robyn Miller (born 1966), American businessman, co-founder of Cyan Worlds
 Robyn Nevin (born 1942), Australian actress, director and former head of the Sydney Theatre Company
 Robyn Ochs (born 1958), American bisexual and LGBT rights activist
 Robyn Regehr (born 1980), Brazilian-born Canadian ice hockey player
 Robyn Slovo (born 1953), South African film producer
 Robyn Smith (born 1944), American jockey
 Robyn Stevens (born 1983), American race walker
 Robyn Williams (born 1944), UK-born Australian science journalist

See also
 Robin (name)

References